The Nio ES8 is a battery-powered, 6 or 7-seat full-size luxury SUV manufactured by Chinese electric car company Nio. The ES8 was put into production in June 2018 for the Chinese market and on 30 September 2021 it was launched in Norway. The ES8 serves as the flagship full-size SUV.

First generation (2018)

The first generation ES8 was first unveiled in December 2017 and production started in 2018. The name ES8 is derived from E means “Electric”, S means “SUV”, the ES8 is an SUV and 8 refers to its model range in Nio’s Performance product range i.e., 1-9, “9” being the top of the range.

Nio tested  the vehicle for thousands of kilometres in Yakeshi, Inner Mongolia, China  and Australia to test the car's winter and summer economy and cold and hot temperature performance.

Nio is cooperating with a number of suppliers including Bosch.

Specifications 

The ES8 is powered by a 70 kWh or 84 kWh lithium-ion battery pack (Upgraded to 100 kWh in 2019), that is also swappable. 

The body and chassis are completely aluminum (96.4 %), and the drivetrain is all-wheel drive as standard, and also features active air suspension. The design includes the X-bar and Nio's signature "Spark Beat" taillights.

2020MY facelift 

In March 2020, a revised ES8 was released. It uses a combination of  permanent magnet and  induction magnet motors. From 2020, the digital cockpit was upgraded to a 9.8-inch display with an 11.3-inch high-definition multi-touch center display. The NOMI Mate 2.0 features an industry-first circular AMOLED display, with much larger active display area. Additionally, ES8 comes with a smart charging port cover and NFC key card. Euro NCAP, in September 2021, confirmed a 5 star rating for the ES8.

Pricing 
Nio ES8 owners can opt for Nio's battery as a service option with the 75kWh battery costing /month and /month for the 100 kWh option.

Second generation (2023)

The second generation Nio ES8 was unveiled during the Nio Day in December 2022 riding on the NT2.0 platform.

Specifications 

The second generation model features a 180kW front motor and a 300kW rear motor reaching a combined maximum power output of 480kW and 850N·m. Acceleration from 0-100km is just under 4.1 seconds. Three battery packs are available as well as the battery leasing program with the 75kWh battery supporting a CLTC range of 465km, the 100kWh battery supporting a CLTC range of 605km, the 150kWh battery supporting a CLTC range of 900km.

See also 
 List of electric cars currently available

References 

ES8
Cars introduced in 2017
Production electric cars
Crossover sport utility vehicles
Euro NCAP large off-road